Clavatula gracilior is a species of sea snail, a marine gastropod mollusk in the family Clavatulidae.

Description
The thick, elongated shell has a pyramidal shape. It is red brown below the epidermis. The pyramidal spire is elongated and it lacks a tumid part anterior to the obtuse and not very prominent angle. The shell lacks a tumid varix at the top of each of the 12 whorls, which can be found in other species of this genus. The small aperture has a white color on top and below, but is yellow in the middle part. The sinus of the outer lip is almost square and extends deeply.

Distribution
It is found in the Amazon rainforest.

References

External links

gracilior
Gastropods described in 1870